Historische Zeitschrift, founded in 1859 by Heinrich von Sybel is considered to be the first and for a time the foremost historical journal. The creation of this journal inspired Gabriel Monod to found the French Revue historique in 1876. In 1886 the English Historical Review was founded and in 1895 the American Historical Review was founded. It is published by Akademie Verlag GmbH, a subsidiary of Oldenbourg Wissenschaftsverlag GmbH.

Editors
Historische Zeitschrift's editors have included:
Heinrich von Sybel (18591895)
Heinrich von Treitschke (18951896)
Friedrich Meinecke (1896–1935)
Jürgen Müller
Eckhardt Treichel
 Andreas Fahrmeir
Hartmut Leppin

See also
 Historiography#Some major historical journals

Further reading

External links 
 

1859 establishments in Germany
Academic journals published in Germany
German-language journals
History journals
Publications established in 1859
De Gruyter academic journals